See either:

 St. Bartholomew's (disambiguation)
Saint Barthélemy (St Barths), in the Caribbean
Saint-Barthélemy (disambiguation)